Jacqueline (also known as Blazing Barriers) is a 1923 American silent northern adventure drama film directed by Dell Henderson and starring Marguerite Courtot, Lew Cody and Edmund Breese. It is based on a 1918 short story of the same title by James Oliver Curwood. It takes place amongst those working in the lumber industry in Quebec.

Cast
 Marguerite Courtot as Jacqueline Roland
 Helen Rowland as Jacqueline, as a child
 Gus Weinberg as 	Her Father
 Effie Shannon as 	Her Mother
 Lew Cody as 	Raoul Radon
 Joseph Depew as 	Raoul Radon, as a child
 Russell Griffin as Little Peter
 J. Barney Sherry as 	His Father
 Edmund Breese as 	Edmund MacDonald
 Edria Fisk as His Daughter
 Sheldon Lewis as 	Henri Dubois
 Charles Fang as 	Li Chang
 Paul Panzer as Gambler

References

Bibliography
 Munden, Kenneth White. The American Film Institute Catalog of Motion Pictures Produced in the United States, Part 1. University of California Press, 1997.

External links

1923 films
1923 adventure films
American adventure films
Films directed by Dell Henderson
American silent feature films
American black-and-white films
Films set in Canada
Arrow Film Corporation films
1920s English-language films
1920s American films
Silent adventure films